Houston County School District is a school district in Houston County, Alabama, headquartered in Dothan.

Schools

High Schools
 Ashford High School
 Cottonwood High School
 Houston County Career Academy
 Houston County High School
 Rehobeth High School
 Wicksburg High School

Middle Schools
 Ashford Middle School
 Rehobeth Middle School

Elementary Schools
 Ashford Elementary School
 Cottonwood Elementary School
 Rehobeth Elementary School
 Webb Elementary School
 Wicksburg Elementary School

The county also offers a Virtual Academy and Dual Enrollment Program.

References

External links
 

School districts in Alabama